Sphenonectris is an extinct genus of thelodont, which lived in Canada during the Early Devonian period.

Sphenonectris possessed a hunched pomacanthid-like body with the only visible fin being the caudal fin.

References

External links
 http://fossils.valdosta.edu/fossil_pages/fossils_dev/f5.html

Fossils of Canada
Thelodonti genera
Early Devonian fish
Devonian jawless fish